Comesomatidae is a family of nematodes belonging to the order Araeolaimida.

Genera
Genera:
 Asymmelaimus Tu, Thanh, Smol & Vanreusel, 2008
 Cervonema Wieser, 1954
 Comesoma Bastian, 1865
 Comesomoides Gourbault, 1980
 Dolichosomatum Allgén, 1951
 Dorylaimopsis Ditlevsen, 1918
 Dorylaimopsis Ditlevsen, 1918
 Expressonema Smolyanko & Belogurov, 1991
 Grahamia Allgén, 1959
 Grahamius Gerlach & Riemann, 1973
 Hopperia Vitiello, 1969
 Kenyanema Muthumbi, Soetaert & Vincx, 1997
 Laimella Cobb, 1920
 Metacomesoma Wieser, 1954
 Metasabatieria Timm, 1961
 Minolaimus Vitiello, 1970
 Notosabatieria Allgén, 1959
 Paracomesoma Hope & Murphy, 1972
 Paracomesoma Schuurmans Stekhoven, 1950
 Paramesonchium Hopper, 1967
 Pierrickia Vitiello, 1970
 Sabatieria Rouville, 1903
 Scholpanialla Sergeeva, 1972
 Scholpaniella Sergeeva, 1973
 Setosabatieria Platt, 1985
 Tridentellia
 Ungulilaimus Allgén, 1958
 Vasostoma Wieser, 1954

References

Nematodes